Puha fulgida is an extinct species of sea snail, a marine gastropod mollusk in the family Raphitomidae.

Description

Distribution
Fossils of this marine species were found in New Zealand
.

References

 Marwick, J. (1931). The Tertiary Mollusca of the Gisborne District. New Zealand Geological Survey Paleontological Bulletin 13:1-177. 18: pls.
 A. G. Beu, P.A. Maxwell, and R.C. Brazier. 1990. Cenozoic Mollusca of New Zealand. New Zealand Geological Survey Paleontological Bulletin 58
 Maxwell, P.A. (2009). Cenozoic Mollusca. Pp 232–254 in Gordon, D.P. (ed.) New Zealand inventory of biodiversity. Volume one. Kingdom Animalia: Radiata, Lophotrochozoa, Deuterostomia. Canterbury University Press, Christchurch.

External links
 

fulgida
Gastropods described in 1931
Gastropods of New Zealand